Jerrick Vincent Frankera Ahanmisi (born October 16, 1997) is an American-born Filipino-Nigerian professional basketball player for the Magnolia Hotshots of the Philippine Basketball Association (PBA).

Ahanmisi played four years of high school basketball for Village Christian High School in San Valley, California. He played college ball at the Adamson Soaring Falcons of the University Athletic Association of the Philippines (UAAP), which awarded him with Mythical Team honors in 2018 in his third season. He followed his older brother Maverick Ahanmisi in the professional league in 2021, playing for the Magnolia Hotshots in the PBA.

PBA career statistics

As of the end of 2021 season

Season-by-season averages

|-
| align="left" | 
| align="left" | Magnolia
| 36 || 13.3 || .347 || .327 || .750 || 1.0 || .6 || .1 || .0 || 4.1
|-class=sortbottom
| align="center" colspan=2 | Career
| 36 || 13.3 || .347 || .327 || .750 || 1.0 || .6 || .1 || .0 || 4.1

References

1997 births
Living people
Filipino men's basketball players
Adamson Soaring Falcons basketball players
Citizens of the Philippines through descent
Filipino people of Nigerian descent
African-American basketball players
American sportspeople of Nigerian descent
Magnolia Hotshots players
Basketball players from California
Point guards
Shooting guards
21st-century African-American sportspeople
American sportspeople of Filipino descent